In the 1924 season of the Campeonato Carioca, two championships were disputed, each by a different league.

AMEA Championship 

After Vasco da Gama's title in 1923, the larger clubs within LMDT attempted to pressure Vasco da Gama to exclude twelve black players from their team, accusing them of being professionals. When Vasco refused and LMDT took Vasco's side, these clubs split from the league and founded AMEA (Associação Metropolitana de Esportes Atléticos, or Metropolitan Athletic Sports Association); Most of the clubs that had been participating in the Série A joined the league, with the addition of SC Brasil, from Série B, and the recently-promoted Hellênico. The league at the time also had CBD's official backing.

The edition of the Campeonato Carioca organized by AMEA kicked off on May 4, 1924 and ended on October 19, 1924. Eight teams participated, Fluminense won the championship for the 9th time. no teams were relegated.

Participating teams

System 
The tournament would be disputed in a double round-robin format, with the team with the most points winning the title.

Championship

LMDT Championship 

The edition of the Campeonato Carioca organized by LMDT (Liga Metropolitana de Desportos Terrestres, or Metropolitan Land Sports League) kicked off on May 25, 1924 and ended on November 30, 1924. Twenty-three teams participated. Vasco da Gama won the championship for the 2nd time. no teams were relegated.

Participating teams

System 
The tournament would be disputed in two stages:

 First stage: The twenty-three teams would be divided into three groups: Série A, Série B and Série C, with their participants being defined by their standings in the previous year's league. The teams in each group played each other in a double round-robin format. The champions of each of the Séries would qualify into the Finals.
 Final stage: The champions of Séries A and C would face each other, and the winner would play against the champions of the Série B to define the champion.

Championship

Série A

Série B

Série C

Final stage

Semifinals

Finals

References 

Campeonato Carioca seasons
Carioca